Parma Associazione Calcio did not manage to compete for a much-vaunted first Serie A title, which still proved elusive. In the summer following the end of the season, star striker Hernán Crespo ran out of patience, and signed with champions Lazio for a then-world record transfer fee, in a deal that saw Matías Almeyda and Sérgio Conçeicão join Parma. Parma did manage to hold on to Lazio targets Gianluigi Buffon and Lilian Thuram, maintaining hope that the club could break its duck in 2000–01.

Players

Squad information

Transfers

Competitions

Overall

Last updated: 14 May 2000

Supercoppa Italiana

Serie A

League table

Results summary

Results by round

Matches

UEFA Champions League qualification

Internazionale qualified to 2000–01 UEFA Champions League's third qualifying round, while Parma qualified to the 2000–01 UEFA Cup first round.

Coppa Italia

Round of 16

UEFA Champions League

Third qualifying round

UEFA Cup

First round

Second round

Third round

Fourth round

Statistics

Players statistics

Goalscorers

Last updated: 14 May 2000

References

Parma Calcio 1913 seasons
Parma